John Weinland Killinger (September 18, 1824 – June 30, 1896) was an American politician from Pennsylvania who served as a Republican member of the U.S. House of Representatives for Pennsylvania's 10th congressional district from 1859 to 1863 and from 1871 to 1875.  He also served as a member of  Pennsylvania's 14th congressional district from 1877 to 1881.

Early life and education
John W. Killinger was born in Annville, Pennsylvania to John and Fanny Killinger.  He attended the public schools of Annville and the Lebanon Academy in Lebanon, Pennsylvania.  He graduated from the Mercersburg Preparatory School in Mercersburg, Pennsylvania, and from Franklin & Marshall College in  Lancaster, Pennsylvania, in 1843.  He studied law in Lancaster, was admitted to the bar in 1846 and practiced in Lebanon County, Pennsylvania, from 1846 to 1886.

Career
He served as prosecuting attorney for Lebanon County in 1848 and 1849.

He was a member of the Pennsylvania State House of Representatives in 1850 and 1851, and served in the Pennsylvania State Senate for the 7th district from 1854 to 1857. He was a delegate to the 1856 Republican National Convention.

Killinger was elected as a Republican to the Thirty-sixth and Thirty-seventh Congresses.  He served as a chairman of the United States House Committee on Expenditures in the Post Office Department during the Thirty-seventh Congress.  He was not a candidate for renomination in 1862.  He served as assessor of internal revenue from 1864 to 1866.

Killinger was again elected to the Forty-second and Forty-third Congresses.  He was not a candidate for renomination in 1874.  He resumed the practice of law.  He was again elected to the Forty-fifth and Forty-sixth Congresses.  He was not a candidate for renomination in 1880.  He served as solicitor for the Philadelphia and Reading Railroad.

He died in Lebanon, Pennsylvania in 1896 and is interred at the Mount Lebanon Cemetery.

Notes

Sources

The Political Graveyard

1824 births
1896 deaths
19th-century American politicians
Franklin & Marshall College alumni
Republican Party members of the Pennsylvania House of Representatives
Pennsylvania lawyers
Republican Party Pennsylvania state senators
People from Lebanon County, Pennsylvania
Republican Party members of the United States House of Representatives from Pennsylvania
19th-century American lawyers